The black-cowled saltator (Saltator nigriceps) is a seed-eating passerine bird in the tanager family Thraupidae. It is found in the southern border region of Ecuador and the northern border region of Peru. Its natural habitats are subtropical or tropical dry forests and subtropical or tropical moist lowland forests.

References

External links
Black-cowled Saltator photo gallery VIREO

black-cowled saltator
Birds of Ecuador
Birds of Peru
Birds of the Tumbes-Chocó-Magdalena
black-cowled saltator
Taxonomy articles created by Polbot